The 1993 Tour de Romandie was the 47th edition of the Tour de Romandie cycle race and was held from 4 May to 9 May 1993. The race started in Courtételle and finished in Geneva. The race was won by Pascal Richard of the Ariostea team.

General classification

References

1993
Tour de Romandie